Pavel Kvasil (born 27 June 1939) is a Czechoslovak sprint canoeist who competed in the late 1960s and the early 1970s. He won a bronze medal in the K-2 10000 m event at the 1966 ICF Canoe Sprint World Championships in East Berlin.

Kvasil also finished ninth in the K-4 1000 m event at the 1972 Summer Olympics in Munich.

He was married to the competitive rower Alena Postlová; his wife died in 2005.

References

Sports-reference.com profile

1939 births
Canoeists at the 1972 Summer Olympics
Czechoslovak male canoeists
Living people
Olympic canoeists of Czechoslovakia
ICF Canoe Sprint World Championships medalists in kayak